Anzal-e Shomali Rural District is in Anzal District of Urmia County, West Azerbaijan province, Iran. At the National Census of 2006, its population was 2,938 in 898 households. There were 2,598 inhabitants in 907 households at the following census of 2011. At the most recent census of 2016, the population of the rural district was 2,252 in 814 households. The largest of its eight villages was Qarah Bagh, with 1,130 people.

References 

Urmia County

Rural Districts of West Azerbaijan Province

Populated places in West Azerbaijan Province

Populated places in Urmia County